Gevorg Karapetovich Hovhannisyan (born 16 June 1983) is an Armenian former footballer who played as a centre-back and made one appearance for the Armenia national team.

Career
Hovhannisyan made his only international appearance for Armenia on 4 September 2016 in a 2018 FIFA World Cup qualification match against Denmark, which finished as a 0–1 away loss.

Career statistics

International

References

External links
 
 
 
 
 

1983 births
Living people
Armenian footballers
Armenia international footballers
Association football central defenders
FC Shirak players
FC Urartu players
Armenian Premier League players
Footballers from Gyumri